The Washington Catholic Athletic Conference (WCAC) is a major high school athletic league for boys, girls, and co-ed Catholic high schools of the Archdiocese of Washington & Diocese of Arlington Schools located in the Washington Metropolitan Area. The WCAC is regarded as one of the best boys and girls basketball and football conference in the nation, with at least 1 team nationally ranked by USA Today every year. The WCAC also has at least one very strong team in all other sports.

Members 
The conference is known for its nationally renowned Basketball, Football, Lacrosse, Track and Field, Wrestling, Soccer, and Baseball programs.It has produced numerous professional athletes in the NFL, NBA, MLS, MLB and MLL.

Holy Cross and Elizabeth Seton are girls only, while Gonzaga, DeMatha and the Heights are all boys.

Sports
The WCAC sponsors competitions in the following sports:

 Baseball
 Basketball
 Cross Country
 Field Hockey
 Football
 Golf
 Ice Hockey
 Lacrosse
 Soccer
 Softball
 Swimming
 Tennis
 Track & Field
 Volleyball
 Wrestling

Football Champions 

1960-Carroll
1961-St. John's
1962-St. John's
1963-St. John's
1964-St. John's
1965-Carroll
1966-DeMatha
1967-DeMatha
1968-St. John's
1969-Carroll
1970-Carroll
1971-Carroll
1972-St. John's
1973-Bishop McNamara
1974-St. John's
1975-St. John's
1976-St. John's
1977-Carroll
1978-Carroll
1979-Carroll
1980-Carroll
1981-Bishop McNamara
1982-DeMatha
1983-Carroll
1984-DeMatha
1985-Carroll
1986-DeMatha
1987-Carroll
1988-Carroll
1989-St. John's
1990-Bishop McNamara
1991-DeMatha
1992-DeMatha
1993-DeMatha
1994-DeMatha
1995-DeMatha
1996-Gonzaga
1997-Gonzaga
1998-DeMatha
1999-St. Paul VI
2000-DeMatha
2001-DeMatha
2002-Gonzaga
2003-DeMatha
2004-DeMatha
2005-DeMatha
2006-DeMatha
2007-DeMatha
2008-DeMatha
2009-Good Counsel
2010-Good Counsel
2011-Good Counsel
2012-Good Counsel
2013-DeMatha
2014-DeMatha
2015-DeMatha
2016-DeMatha
2017-St. John’s
2018-Gonzaga (Capital)/Ryken (Metro)
2019-Good Counsel (Capital)/Ryken (Metro)
2021-St. John’s (Capital)/Ryken (Metro)

Boys Basketball Champions 

1961-DeMatha
1962-DeMatha
1963-DeMatha
1964-DeMatha
1965-DeMatha
1966-DeMatha
1967-Mackin (Carroll)
1968-DeMatha
1969-DeMatha
1970-DeMatha
1971-DeMatha
1972-DeMatha
1973-DeMatha
1974-DeMatha
1975-DeMatha
1976-DeMatha
1977-St. John's
1978-DeMatha
1979-DeMatha
1980-DeMatha
1981-DeMatha
1982-DeMatha
1983-DeMatha
1984-DeMatha
1985-DeMatha
1986-Gonzaga
1987-DeMatha
1988-DeMatha
1989-Carroll
1990-DeMatha
1991-DeMatha
1992-DeMatha
1993-Carroll
1994-DeMatha
1995-McNamara
1996-DeMatha
1997-Gonzaga
1998-DeMatha
1999-Gonzaga
2000-St. John's
2001-DeMatha
2002-DeMatha
2003-Gonzaga
2004-O'Connell
2005-DeMatha
2006-DeMatha
2007-DeMatha
2008-Gonzaga
2009-DeMatha
2010-DeMatha
2011-DeMatha
2012-St. Paul VI
2013-O'Connell
2014-St. Paul VI
2015-Gonzaga
2016-St. John's
2017-Gonzaga
2018-DeMatha
2019-Gonzaga
2020-DeMatha
2022-St. Paul VI

Girls Basketball Champions 
1994-O'Connell
1995-Good Counsel
1996-Elizabeth Seton
1997-Elizabeth Seton
1998-St. John's
1999-St. John's
2000-St. John's
2001-Elizabeth Seton
2002-St. John's
2003-McNamara
2004-St. John's
2005-Good Counsel
2006-Good Counsel
2007-Holy Cross
2008-McNamara
2009-Good Counsel
2010-Elizabeth Seton
2011-St. John's
2012-Good Counsel
2013-St. John's
2014-St. Paul VI
2015-St. Paul VI
2016-St. Paul VI
2017-St. John's
2018-St. John's
2019-St. John's
2020-McNamara
2022-St. John's
2023-St. John’s

Baseball 
1968-DeMatha
1969-St. John's
1970-DeMatha
1971-St. John's
1972-Good Counsel
1973-Carroll
1974-Carroll
1975-DeMatha
1976-St. John's
1977-St. John's
1978-DeMatha
1979-DeMatha
1980-DeMatha
1981-DeMatha
1982-O'Connell
1983-DeMatha
1984-DeMatha
1985-DeMatha
1986-Good Counsel
1987-DeMatha
1988-DeMatha
1989-O'Connell
1990-Good Counsel
1991-DeMatha
1992-DeMatha
1993-St. Paul VI
1994-DeMatha
1995-DeMatha
1996-DeMatha
1997-DeMatha
1998-DeMatha
1999-St. John's
2000-Gonzaga
2001-O'Connell
2002-DeMatha
2003-DeMatha
2004-DeMatha
2005-St. John's
2006-Good Counsel
2007-St. Paul VI
2008-DeMatha
2009-St. Paul VI
2010-Good Counsel
2011-St. John's
2012-St. Paul VI
2013-DeMatha
2014-St. John's
2015-St. John's
2016-St. John's
2017-St. John's
2018-St. John's
2019-St. John's

Boys soccer champions 
1974-DeMatha
1975-Carroll
1976-Good Counsel
1977-Carroll
1978-Good Counsel
1979-Good Counsel
1980-O'Connell
1981-O'Connell
1982-O'Connell
1983-O'Connell
1984-O'Connell
1985-Ireton
1986-St. John's
1987-DeMatha
1988-Good Counsel
1989-St. Paul VI
1990-Ireton
1991-O'Connell
1992-Gonzaga/St. Paul VI
1993-McNamara
1994-Ireton
1995-St. Paul VI
1996-O'Connell
1997-St. Paul VI
1998-O'Connell
1999-DeMatha
2000-Gonzaga
2001-Gonzaga
2002-Gonzaga
2003-DeMatha
2004-DeMatha
2005-DeMatha
2006-Gonzaga
2007-Gonzaga
2008-Gonzaga
2009-Gonzaga
2010-DeMatha
2011-DeMatha
2012-Gonzaga
2013-DeMatha
2014-DeMatha
2015-DeMatha
2016-Gonzaga
2017-Gonzaga
2018-The Heights (1st year in league)
2019-Gonzaga

Boys Lacrosse champions 
1987-Bishop Ireton
1988-Dematha
1989-Dematha
1990-Dematha
1991-Dematha
1992-Gonzaga
1993-Gonzaga
1994-Dematha
1995-Dematha
1996-Dematha
1997-Gonzaga
1998-Gonzaga
1999-Dematha
2000-Dematha
2001-Dematha
2002-Dematha
2003-Dematha
2004-Dematha
2005-Dematha
2006-Dematha
2007-St. Mary's Ryken
2008-Dematha
2009-Dematha
2010-Gonzaga
2011-Gonzaga
2012-Gonzaga
2013-Gonzaga
2014-Gonzaga
2015-Gonzaga
2016-Gonzaga
2017-St. John's
2018-Gonzaga
2019-Gonzaga

Wrestling champions 
1975-Carroll
1976-Bishop McNamara
1977-Good Counsel
1978-Good Counsel
1979-St. John's
1980-Good Counsel
1981-Good Counsel
1982-O'Connell
1983-O'Connell
1984-Bishop McNamara
1985-O'Connell
1986-Dematha
1987-Dematha
1988-Dematha
1989-Dematha
1990-Dematha
1991-Dematha
1992-Dematha
1993-Dematha
1994-Dematha
1995-Dematha
1996-Dematha
1997-Dematha
1998-Dematha
1999-Dematha
2000-Dematha
2001-Dematha/O'Connell
2002-Dematha
2003-Dematha
2004-Dematha
2005-Dematha
2006-Dematha
2007-Dematha
2008-Dematha
2009-O'Connell
2010-Dematha
2011-Good Counsel
2012-Dematha
2013-Good Counsel
2014-Good Counsel
2015-Good Counsel
2016-Good Counsel
2017-St. John's
2018-St. John’s
2019-St. John’s
2020-St. Mary’s Ryken

Golf champions 
1973-Good Counsel
1974-Good Counsel
1975-Good Counsel
1976-St. John's
1977-St. John's
1978-St. John's
1979-St. John's
1980-Bishop McNamara
1981-Dematha
1982-Good Counsel
1983-Dematha
1984-Dematha
1985-Dematha
1986-Bishop McNamara
1987-Good Counsel
1988-Bishop McNamara
1989-Dematha
1990-Good Counsel
1991-Gonzaga
1992-Good Counsel
1993-Dematha
1994-Dematha
1995-Dematha
1996-Dematha
1997-Dematha
1998-Dematha
1999-Dematha
2000-O'Connell
2001-St. Paul VI
2002-Gonzaga
2003-St. Paul VI
2004-Dematha
2005-Gonzaga
2006-Gonzaga
2007-Gonzaga
2008-Dematha
2009-St. Paul VI
2010-Gonzaga
2011-Gonzaga
2012-Gonzaga
2013-Gonzaga
2014-St. Paul VI
2015-Gonzaga
2016-Gonzaga
2017-Gonzaga
2018-Gonzaga
2019-Gonzaga

Boys Tennis champions 
1979-Archbishop Carroll
1982-O'Connell
1983-St. John's
1984-St. John's
1985-Gonzaga
1986-Gonzaga
1987-Gonzaga
1988-Gonzaga
1989-Gonzaga
1990-Gonzaga
1991-Gonzaga
1992-Gonzaga
1993-Gonzaga
1994-Gonzaga
1995-Gonzaga
1996-Dematha
1997-Dematha
1998-Dematha
1999-Dematha
2000-Dematha
2001-Good Counsel
2002-Dematha
2003-Dematha
2004-Dematha
2005-Gonzaga
2006-Gonzaga
2007-Dematha
2008-Gonzaga
2009-Dematha
2010-Gonzaga
2011-Gonzaga
2012-Gonzaga
2013-Gonzaga
2014-Gonzaga
2015-O'Connell
2016-Gonzaga
2017-Gonzaga
2018-Good Counsel
2019-Gonzaga
2022-Gonzaga

Boys Ice Hockey champions 
2017-DeMatha
2018-DeMatha
2019-DeMatha
2020-DeMatha
2022-St.John's

Boys Swim and Dive Champions 
2018-Gonzaga
2019-Gonzaga
2020-Gonzaga

Alumni 
Archbishop Carroll
John Thompson, Jr. (1961), Former NBA player and men's basketball coach at Georgetown University
Eddie Jordan (1973), Former NBA player and coach, current assistant coach with the Charlotte Hornets
Lawrence Moten (attended but did not graduate), Former NBA player
Ruben Boumtje-Boumtje (1997), Former NBA player
Jamal Williams (1995), Former NFL player
Jevon Langford (1992), Former NFL player
Kris Joseph (2008), former NBA player
Jeremiah Attaochu (2011), Current NFL player
Mike Lonergan (1984), Former basketball head coach Catholic University of America, University of Vermont, George Washington University

Bishop Ireton
Charlie Raphael, Former professional soccer player

Bishop McNamara
Waine Bacon, Former NFL player
Todd Bozeman, Current basketball coach at Morgan State University
Jerome Couplin III, Current NFL player
Brandon Coleman, Current NFL player
Tyoka Jackson, Former NFL player
Ty Lawson, Current NBA player
Talib Zanna, Current NBA player

Bishop O'Connell
Kendall Marshall, Current NBA player
Eric Metcalf, Former NFL player
Terrence Wilkins, Former NFL player
Melo Trimble, Current professional basketball player
Gibran Hamdan, Former NFL player
John Arsala, Former professional soccer player
Nataly Arias, Former professional soccer player
Kate Ziegler, World champion swimmer

DeMatha
Markelle Fultz, Current NBA player
Brett Cecil, Current MLB player
Steve Farr, Former MLB player
Johnny Austin, Former NBA player
Keith Bogans, Current NBA player
Adrian Branch, Former NBA player
Mike Brey, Current basketball coach at Notre Dame
Kenny Carr, Former NBA player
Sid Catlett, Former NBA player
Adrian Dantley, Former NBA player
Danny Ferry, Former NBA player
Joseph Forte, Former NBA player
Sidney Lowe, Former NBA player
Jerrod Mustaf, Former NBA player
Victor Oladipo, Current NBA player
Charles Whitney, Former NBA player
Bernie Williams, Former NBA player
JB Brown, Former NFL player
Mike Johnson, Former NFL player
Quinn Ojinnaka, Former NFL player, current wrestler
John Owens, Former NFL player
Tony Paige, Former NFL player
Steve Smith, Former NFL player
Cameron Wake, Current NFL player
Brian Westbrook, Former NFL player
Edwin Williams, Former NFL player
Josh Wilson, Former NFL player
Rodney McLeod, Current NFL player
Jordan Graye, Current MLS player
Derek Mills, Olympic Gold Medalist
Jerami Grant, Current NBA player
Jerian Grant, Current NBA player
Cyrus Kouandjio, Current NFL player
Arie Kouandjio, Current NFL player
Paul Rabil, Current MLL player, Co-Founder PLL
Chase Young, Former Ohio State Football Player
Bill Hamid, Current MLS player, member of USMNT

Gonzaga
Cam Johnson, Current NFL player
Johnson Bademosi, Current NFL player
Jon Morris, Former NFL player
John Thompson III, Former basketball coach at Georgetown University
Roman Oben, Former NFL player
Curome Cox, Current NFL player
Mike Banner, Former MLS player
Joey Haynos, Current NFL player
Colin Cloherty, Current NFL player
A. J. Francis, Current NFL player
Malcolm Johnson, Former NFL player
Kevin Hogan, Current NFL player
Kris Jenkins (basketball), Current Euroleague player

Good Counsel
Zach Hilton, Former NFL player
Joe Lefeged Former NFL player
Steve Howes, Former basketball coach at Catholic University of America, Current Athletic Director at Good Counsel
Tarik Walker, Former Professional Soccer Player & President FC USA Baltimore, MD
Marty Hurney, Former NFL General Manager
Chas Gessner, Former NFL player
Roger Mason, Former NBA player
Jelani Jenkins, Current NFL player
Stefon Diggs, Current NFL player
Blake Countess Current NFL player
Kendall Fuller Current NFL player

St. Paul VI
Erick Green, Current professional basketball player
Eddie Royal, Former NFL player, (graduated from Westfield High School)
Mike Venafro, Former MLB Pitcher

St. John's
Gene Augusterfer, Former NFL player
Scott Glacken, Former NFL player
Tommy Marvaso, Former NFL player
Mike Kruczek, Former NFL player
Jay Williams, Former NFL player
Chris Harrison, Former NFL player
Marques Ogden, Former NFL player
Conrad Bolston, Former NFL player
Bobby Lewis, Former NBA player
Chris Wright, Former NBA player
Marissa Coleman, Current WNBA player
Perry Currin, Former MLB player
L.J. Hoes, Current MLB player
Nicholas Howard, Current MLB player
Kevin Plank, Founder, CEO, and Chairman of the Board of Under Armour

References

High school sports conferences and leagues in Washington, D.C.
Maryland high school sports conferences
Catholic Church in Washington, D.C.
Catholic sports organizations